The 17603/17604 Prashanti Nilayam Express is an express train belonging to Indian Railways that runs between  and  in India.

It operates as train number 17603 from Kacheguda to Yelahanka Junction and as train number 17604 in the reverse direction, serving the states of Telangana, Andhra Pradesh, Karnataka.

Previously, it used to run upto .

Coaches

The 17603/17604 Prashanti Nilayam Express presently has 1 First Class AC Coach, 2 AC 2 Tier, 2 AC 3 Tier, 10 Sleeper Class & 2 General Unreserved coaches. It frequently carries a couple of High Capacity Parcel Van coaches.

As with most train services in India, coach composition may be amended at the discretion of Indian Railways depending on demand.

Service

The 17603 Prashanti Nilayam Express covers the distance of 652 kilometres in 12 hours 30 mins (52 km/hr) & 12 hours 40 mins as 17604 Yelahanka Junction–Kacheguda Prashanti Nilayam Express (53 km/hr).

As its average speed in both directions is below 55 km/hr as per Indian Railways rules, it does not have a Express surcharge.

Routeing

The 17603 / 04 Kacheguda–Yesvantpur Junction Prashanti Nilayam Express runs from Kacheguda via 
Jadcherla, Mahbubnagar, 
, 
,  to Yelahanka Junction.

Traction

The Gooty-based WDP-4D locos haul the train from Kacheguda until  after which Lallaguda-based WAP-7 / Vijayawada-based WAP-4 would take over until Yelahanka Junction.

References

External links
 17603 Prashanti Nilayam Express at India Rail Info
 17604 Prashanti Nilayam Express at India Rail Info

Transport in Hyderabad, India
Transport in Bangalore
Railway services introduced in 2001
Named passenger trains of India
Rail transport in Telangana
Rail transport in Andhra Pradesh
Rail transport in Karnataka
Express trains in India